Kevin Ash (10 December 1959 – 22 January 2013) was a British motorcycle journalist and author, who contributed to The Daily Telegraph and to  Motor Cycle News.

Covering technical as well as topical issues, Ash was described as "one of the key figures of the British motorcycle scene", 
"one of the world's leading motorcycle journalists", and "the doyen of motorcycle correspondents."

Personal life
Ash was born in Ilford, a town in north-east London, part of Greater London administrative area. He attended Ipswich School, then studied engineering at Imperial College. In 1990, he married Caroline Quanjer, of the Netherlands, with whom he had three daughters: Laurien, Kirsten and Ingrid, who were 20, 18 and 10 at the time of his death.

Career
Before becoming a journalist, Ash was a motorcycle courier. He also participated in sidecar racing. In 1991, he was a founding contributor at the magazine Fast Bikes.

He then joined Motor Cycle News (MCN) as a road tester in 1993, following a road traffic accident involving a car and a BMW K1100RS ridden by (then) MCN road editor Chris Dabbs, who suffered life-changing injuries. Ash progressed to assistant editor until leaving in 1997 to become a freelance writer.

As a freelancer, he contributed to The Daily Telegraph for 15 years as its motorcycling correspondent.

Ash authored several motorcycle-related books, including BMW Motorcycles: The Evolution of Excellence and Ducati People: Looking into the Lives of the Men and Women Behind This Legendary Marque. He also authored a guide, Going Dutch, in the late 1990s on the parallel import of right-hand drive cars to the United Kingdom from other countries in the European Union.

Death

Ash was involved in a fatal motorcycle crash near George, Western Cape in South Africa, during a press test ride at the launch of the 2013 BMW R1200GS.

Ash crashed his R1200GS motorcycle during one of BMW's six scheduled press launch trips that included a total of 60 to 70 journalists, while passing through Baviaanskloof Mega Reserve on a gravel road between Willowmore and Patensie. UK motorcycle journalist Alun Davies, following directly behind Ash on another motorcycle, either struck or narrowly avoided striking (reports vary) the fallen Ash and his motorcycle, which straddled the route. Davies was treated at a hospital for a dislocated shoulder and other injuries and discharged several days later.

BMW engineers from Germany were brought to South Africa to investigate all the test motorcycles.  investigators have neither announced a connection between a possible problem with the motorcycle and the crash nor released formal details of the accident or investigation.

Works

Notes

References

External links 
 

Motorcycle journalists
British motoring journalists
The Daily Telegraph people
Motorcycle road incident deaths
Road incident deaths in South Africa
1959 births
2013 deaths
People from Ilford
People educated at Ipswich School
Alumni of Imperial College London
20th-century English businesspeople